This is a list of electoral division results in the Australian 2004 federal election for the state of New South Wales.

Overall

New South Wales

Banks 
This section is an excerpt from Electoral results for the Division of Banks § 2004

Barton 
This section is an excerpt from Electoral results for the Division of Barton § 2004

Bennelong 
This section is an excerpt from Electoral results for the Division of Bennelong § 2004

Berowra 
This section is an excerpt from Electoral results for the Division of Berowra § 2004

Blaxland 
This section is an excerpt from Electoral results for the Division of Blaxland § 2004

Bradfield 
This section is an excerpt from Electoral results for the Division of Bradfield § 2004

Calare 
This section is an excerpt from Electoral results for the Division of Calare § 2004

Charlton 
This section is an excerpt from Electoral results for the Division of Charlton § 2004

Chifley 
This section is an excerpt from Electoral results for the Division of Chifley § 2004

Cook 
This section is an excerpt from Electoral results for the Division of Cook § 2004

Cowper 
This section is an excerpt from Electoral results for the Division of Cowper § 2004

Cunningham 
This section is an excerpt from Electoral results for the Division of Cunningham § 2004

Dobell 
This section is an excerpt from Electoral results for the Division of Dobell § 2004

Eden-Monaro 
This section is an excerpt from Electoral results for the Division of Eden-Monaro § 2004

Farrer 
This section is an excerpt from Electoral results for the Division of Farrer § 2004

Fowler 
This section is an excerpt from Electoral results for the Division of Fowler § 2004

Gilmore 
This section is an excerpt from Electoral results for the Division of Gilmore § 2004

Grayndler 
This section is an excerpt from Electoral results for the Division of Grayndler § 2004

Greenway 
This section is an excerpt from Electoral results for the Division of Greenway § 2004

Gwydir 
This section is an excerpt from Electoral results for the Division of Gwydir § 2004

Hughes 
This section is an excerpt from Electoral results for the Division of Hughes § 2004

Hume 
This section is an excerpt from Electoral results for the Division of Hume § 2004

Hunter 
This section is an excerpt from Electoral results for the Division of Hunter § 2004

Kingsford Smith 
This section is an excerpt from Electoral results for the Division of Kingsford Smith § 2004

Lindsay 
This section is an excerpt from Electoral results for the Division of Lindsay § 2004

Lowe 
This section is an excerpt from Electoral results for the Division of Lowe § 2004

Lyne 
This section is an excerpt from Electoral results for the Division of Lyne § 2004

Macarthur 
This section is an excerpt from Electoral results for the Division of Macarthur § 2004

Mackellar 
This section is an excerpt from Electoral results for the Division of Mackellar § 2004

Macquarie 
This section is an excerpt from Electoral results for the Division of Macquarie § 2004

Mitchell 
This section is an excerpt from Electoral results for the Division of Mitchell § 2004

New England 
This section is an excerpt from Electoral results for the Division of New England § 2004

Newcastle 
This section is an excerpt from Electoral results for the Division of Newcastle2004

North Sydney 
This section is an excerpt from Electoral results for the Division of North Sydney § 2004

Page 
This section is an excerpt from Electoral results for the Division of Page § 2004

Parkes 
This section is an excerpt from Electoral results for the Division of Parkes § 2004

Parramatta 
This section is an excerpt from Electoral results for the Division of Parramatta § 2004

Paterson 
This section is an excerpt from Electoral results for the Division of Paterson § 2004

Prospect 
This section is an excerpt from Electoral results for the Division of Prospect § 2004

Reid
This section is an excerpt from Electoral results for the Division of Reid § 2004

Richmond 
This section is an excerpt from Electoral results for the Division of Richmond § 2004

Riverina 
This section is an excerpt from Electoral results for the Division of Riverina § 2004

Robertson 
This section is an excerpt from Electoral results for the Division of Robertson § 2004

Shortland 
This section is an excerpt from Electoral results for the Division of Shortland § 2004

Sydney 
This section is an excerpt from Electoral results for the Division of Sydney § 2004

Throsby 
This section is an excerpt from Electoral results for the Division of Throwsby § 2004

Warringah 
This section is an excerpt from Electoral results for the Division of Warringah § 2004

Watson 
This section is an excerpt from Electoral results for the Division of Watson § 2004

Wentworth 
This section is an excerpt from Electoral results for the Division of Wentworth § 2004

Werriwa 
This section is an excerpt from Electoral results for the Division of Werriwa § 2004

See also 
 Members of the Australian House of Representatives, 2004–2007

Notes

References 

New South Wales 2004
Elections in New South Wales